Petr Kovářík (born 21 May 1945) is a Czech former sports shooter. He competed at the 1972 Summer Olympics and the 1976 Summer Olympics.

References

1945 births
Living people
Czech male sport shooters
Olympic shooters of Czechoslovakia
Shooters at the 1972 Summer Olympics
Shooters at the 1976 Summer Olympics
Sportspeople from Kolín
20th-century Czech people